Komshilovo is a rural locality (a village) in Karinskoye Rural Settlement, Alexandrovsky District, Vladimir Oblast, Russia. The population was 22 as of 2010. There are 2 streets.

Geography 
Komshilovo is located 14 km south of Alexandrov (the district's administrative centre) by road. Karabanovo is the nearest rural locality.

References 

Rural localities in Alexandrovsky District, Vladimir Oblast